Yang Gyeong-hui (born 25 January 1971) is a South Korean sprinter. She competed in the women's 400 metres at the 1988 Summer Olympics.

References

External links
 

1971 births
Living people
Athletes (track and field) at the 1988 Summer Olympics
South Korean female sprinters
Olympic athletes of South Korea
Place of birth missing (living people)
Olympic female sprinters